The Winter Fuel Payment is a state benefit paid once per year in the United Kingdom to people old enough to have been born before a specific date. It is intended to cover the additional costs of heating over the winter months. It was first introduced by the Labour government in 1997, and was first announced by Chancellor of the Exchequer Gordon Brown in his Pre-Budget Statement of that year.

Eligibility 
To be eligible for the benefit in a particular year, a person must have been born before a specific qualifying date (e.g. 5 April 1954 for payments for the winter 2019–2020), and have lived in the UK for at least one day during the week of 16 to 22 September 2019 - this is called the ‘qualifying week’. Certain categories of people are excluded groups (prisoners, people receiving long-term free hospital care, those with certain immigration issues, and those living in care homes and receiving income-related benefits such as pension credit). Thus for the winter of 2019-2020 the benefit was available to those aged 65 by 5  April 2019.  The benefit may also be applicable to those living in Switzerland or the EEA.

Amount 
The amount paid is greater for those aged eighty years and older and is set so that a person living alone (or with people ineligible for the payment) is paid twice as much as a person in a household where more than one person receives the payment. In the winter 2020-2021 the amount paid was £100 to £300 depending on circumstances. If the weather is particularly cold, a cold weather payment may also be made.

Administration 
In Great Britain, the Social Fund Winter Fuel Payment Regulations 2000 govern the system, under the Social Security Contributions and Benefits Act 1992. In Northern Ireland the Social Fund Winter Fuel Payment Regulations (Northern Ireland) 2000  govern the system.

In the winter of 2011–12, the benefit cost the UK Government £2,100,000,000 and was paid out to 12,700,000 people. It was criticised by Paul Burstow (former care services minister) in 2013 for its lack of targeting, Burstow saying that "80% of older people do not require [the benefit]" and proposing that it be only given to pensioners on pension credit which he said would save £1.5 bn a year. He suggested that the savings be used to help implement the findings of the Dilnot Commission into social care. However, in 2013 about 1 million of 3 million eligible people did not claim pension credit.

References

External links

Welfare state in the United Kingdom
Winter in the United Kingdom